The 2022 Missouri Valley Conference baseball tournament will be held from May 24 through 29.  All eight baseball-sponsoring schools in the conference will participate in the double-elimination tournament to be held at Missouri State's Hammons Field in Springfield, Missouri.  The winner of the tournament will earn the conference's automatic bid to the 2022 NCAA Division I baseball tournament.

Seeding and format
The league's eight teams will be seeded based on conference winning percentage.  The four lowest seeds will participate in a play-in round with the winners advancing to a six-team double-elimination bracket.

Results
Play-in round

Double-elimination round

Schedule

References

Tournament
Missouri Valley Conference Baseball Tournament
Missouri Valley Conference baseball tournament